Eryn Shewell (born June 26, 1984) is an American jazz and blues guitarist and vocalist from Jackson, New Jersey, United States.

Early life
Eryn Shewell was born on June 26, 1984 in Washington, D.C.

In 1989 Shewell's parents divorced and she moved with her mother to New Jersey. She went to high school there, graduating in 2002.

Personal life
Shewell is married to Matt O'Ree.

Career

Early career
Shewell studied music theory and voice at Jackson Memorial High School in Jackson, New Jersey. After high school, Shewell joined the New Orleans funk band The Soul Project.

Recent years
Shewell started The Eryn Shewell Band in 2006. In 2016, Shewell and her husband were inducted into the NY/NJ Blues Hall of Fame.

Discography
Window Pane (September 9, 2008). Rewbie Music LLC 
4th And Broadway (December 19, 2009). Rewbie Music LLC
Children at Play (June 24, 2012). Rewbie Music LLC
 Eryn Shewell (June 2, 2013). Rewbie Music LLC
 "You Angel You" single on DYLAN : Philadelphia pays tribute to a legend 2012
 It's All Making Sense (February 2013) Alice Leon's 2013 release. 
 A Day Like This (June 2012) Lily Ann Riche's debut release
 "Santa Baby" (November 2015) Belk commercial
 Brotherhood (November 2016) Matt O'Ree Band, Therewolf Records
 Pantyhose (January 2017) Kristin Rose Kelly's debut release.
 Lady E. (June 2018) Eryn Shewell.

References

1984 births
21st-century American women singers
American blues guitarists
American blues singers
American child singers
American women singer-songwriters
American rhythm and blues singers
American rock songwriters
American soul musicians
American women rock singers
Guitarists from New Jersey
Guitarists from Washington, D.C.
Living people
People from Jackson Township, New Jersey
Singer-songwriters from New Jersey
21st-century American singers
21st-century American guitarists
21st-century American women guitarists
Singer-songwriters from Washington, D.C.